The Convento de Santa Dorotea is an Augustinian nun's convent in Burgos, Castile and León, Spain. It is a Gothic construction, and dates back to 1387, when Dorotea Rodriguez Valderrama, along with other devout women formed a nun's community at the old church of Santa Maria la Blanca. The community adopted the rule of St. Augustine in 1429 with the support of Bishop Pablo de Santamaría. In 1457 they moved to the church of San Andrés, until in 1470 they settled in the current location in the barrio of San Pedro y San Felices. Among the many benefactors who favored the monastery was King John II of Castile. Tombs of note include those of Alonso de Ortega (died 1501), and Bishop Juan de Ortega, the work of Nicholas de Vergara, 1516.

References

Roman Catholic churches in Burgos
Monasteries in Castile and León
Gothic architecture in Burgos
1387 establishments in Europe
Roman Catholic churches completed in 1470
Religious buildings and structures completed in 1470
14th-century establishments in Castile
15th-century Roman Catholic church buildings in Spain